Grass Widow is an American indie rock band from San Francisco, California. Their music has been described as discordant and lo-fi, and connected to the post-punk roots of the members of the band.

The band was formed in 2007 with members from the band Shitstorm. All three members share vocal duties. Hannah Lew plays bass, Raven Mahon plays guitar and Lillian Maring plays the drums. The band mentions in interviews their intentionally collaborative creative process, and their focus on sustainability in their music careers, opting to tour for only two weeks at a time to stay connected with friends and family. Songs are created together in their San Francisco practice space and all contribute equally to the work of the band.

Members of the band are often asked about the fact that the band is all-women and about their feminism, and have responded with a quote from Gina Birch: "And you ask me if I’m a Feminist? Why the hell would I not be?!" They cite influences like Neo Boys and Kleenex, they also note Roy Wood's The Move and The Kinks as a major source of inspiration.

The band dissolved circa 2013, members pursuing their respective projects.

Discography

Studio albums
Grass Widow (2009, Make A Mess Records)
Past Time (2010, Kill Rock Stars)
Internal Logic (2012, HLR label)

Other Releases
Grass Widow  (2009, Captured Tracks)
Milo Minute 7" (2011, HLR label)
Disappearing Industries (2012, HLR label)

References

Reviews
 .
 .
 .

External links

 .
 
 .
 .

All-female bands
Indie rock musical groups from California
Musical groups from San Francisco
History of women in California